The Earl Scruggs Revue is the title of a recording by Earl Scruggs, released in 1973.

Track listing
Side 1
 "If I'd Only Come and Gone" (Shel Silverstein) – 2:55
 "Tears" (Craig Fuller) – 2:12
 "Some of Shelley's Blues" (Michael Nesmith) – 2:57
 "It Takes a Lot to Laugh, It Takes a Train to Cry" (Bob Dylan) – 4:25
 "Step It Up and Go" (Blind Boy Fuller) – 2:25
 "Back Slider's Wine" (Michael Martin Murphey) – 2:33
Side 2
 "Down in the Flood" (Bob Dylan) – 2:38
 "Love In My Time" (Steve Young) – 3:43
 "Holiday Hotel" (Alan Garth, Jim Messina) – 2:07
 "Come On Train" (Josh Graves) – 5:30
 "Salty Dog Blues" (Wiley Morris, Zeke Morris) – 2:10
 "Station Break" (Earl Scruggs) - 1:59

Personnel
Earl Scruggs – banjo, backing vocals
Gary Scruggs - electric bass, harmonica, lead vocals
Randy Scruggs - electric and acoustic lead guitars, rhythm guitar, backing vocals
Jody Maphis - drums, backing vocals
Josh Graves - dobro, guitar, lead vocals on "Step It Up and Go"; backing vocals
Jack Lee - keyboards
With:
Tracy Nelson - backing vocals
Andy McMahon - piano, organ, backing vocals
Chip Young - rhythm guitar
The Holladays - backing vocals on "Down in the Flood"
Karl Himmel - drums on "Love in My Time", "Tears" and "Come on Train"

References
All information from the LP liner notes.

1973 albums
Earl Scruggs albums